Tommy's margarita is a variant of the margarita cocktail. It is recognized by the IBA as a new era drink.

Mixture
It is made with tequila, lime juice, and agave nectar or simple syrup and served in a cocktail glass. It is distinct from the margarita in its omission of orange liqueur and its preferred substitution of agave Nectar, to accent the notes in the agave based spirits. You will also see it made using Orange Bitters to bring in the familiar notes of the orange liqueur that has been omitted.

History
Tommy's margarita was conceived in San Francisco in 1990 by Julio Bermejo at his parents' restaurant called Tommy's (not to be confused with Tommy's Place in Juárez, Mexico. See Margarita Origin). Bermejo had been recently introduced to agave nectar as an ingredient, and, although it was still expensive at the time, he preferred to use it to enhance the agave flavor of the cocktail instead of using triple sec to highlight the citrus flavor in the original Margarita recipe. In 2008, it became the first venue specific cocktail to be added to the IBA manual.

See also
List of cocktails
List of IBA official cocktails

Bibliography

Cocktails
Cocktails with tequila